The 1979 Ogun State gubernatorial election occurred on July 28, 1979. UPN candidate Olabisi Onabanjo won the election.

Results
Olabisi Onabanjo representing UPN won the election. The election held on July 28, 1979.

References 

Ogun State gubernatorial elections
Ogun State gubernatorial election
Ogun State gubernatorial election